The William Hawk Cabin at 458 North 3rd West, Salt Lake City, Utah, United States, is a "Pennsylvania style" log cabin that was built between 1848 and 1852.

Description
The cabin is significant primarily for its association with William Hawk, whose home it was from 1852 until his death in 1883.  William Hawk had extraordinary moments in his life; for one instance he was sent by Mormon Samuel Brannan to carry news from California to Independence, Missouri, via Salt Lake City, that gold had been found at Sutter's Creek.

The cabin was listed on the National Register of Historic Places in 1978.

Interior restoration was completed in February, 2019.

See also

 National Register of Historic Places listings in Salt Lake City

References

Houses completed in 1848
Houses in Salt Lake City
Houses on the National Register of Historic Places in Utah
Log cabins in the United States
National Register of Historic Places in Salt Lake City
Log buildings and structures on the National Register of Historic Places in Utah